Ryan Byrnes (born 3 May 2001) is an Australian rules footballer playing for the St Kilda Football Club in the Australian Football League (AFL). He was recruited by St Kilda with the 52nd pick in the 2019 AFL draft.

Early football
Byrnes played junior football for his local club, St Paul's McKinnon JFC. He also played football for his school side at St Bede's College, where he was a part of their premiership team in the Associated Catholic Colleges division. Byrnes played a part in getting his school their first Herald Sun Shield win. He also played for the Sandringham Dragons in the NAB League for the 2018 and 2019 seasons, and was named captain for the latter. He also won the Dragons' best and fairest award in 2019. Over the 2 seasons he played for the club, he kicked 6 goals and participated in 27 matches. He was 3rd in the Best & Fairest 2018 for his bottom age year at Sandringham Dragons and won the Best & Fairest in his senior year up for the Sandringham Dragons. Byrnes represented Vic Metro in the AFL Under 18 Championships for the 2019 season.

AFL career

Byrnes debuted in the Saints' 23 point victory over the Adelaide Crows in the 7th round of the 2020 AFL season, becoming the 1616th player to represent St Kilda. On debut, Byrnes picked up 5 disposals and 2 tackles. Byrnes suffered a hamstring injury at training in the preseason of the 2021 AFL season, which saw him miss the first four games of the season. Byrnes was called up to the senior side in round seven for just his second AFL game and collected 18 disposals and nine marks. Byrnes maintained his spot into round eight where he had 16 disposals and five marks. Byrnes had a career-high 24 disposals and 12 marks in the Round 10 loss to the Western Bulldogs. He was also impressive against top four side Brisbane in Round 17, collecting 15 disposals, had seven score involvements and kicked two goals in the Saints' upset win. Byrnes ultimately played every game from round seven to 23 (he was a used medical sub for round 23), completing 16 of a possible 22 games for the season. Brynes was predominantly used as a half forward, winger or inside midfielder in 2021.

Statistics
 Statistics are correct to the end of round 7, 2022

|- style="background-color: #EAEAEA"
! scope="row" style="text-align:center" | 2020
|style="text-align:center;"|
| 31 || 1 || 0 || 0 || 2 || 3 || 5 || 0 || 2 || 0.0 || 0.0 || 2.0 || 3.0 || 5.0 || 0.0 || 2.0
|-
! scope="row" style="text-align:center" | 2021
|
| 31 || 16 || 6 || 1 || 131 || 116 || 247 || 76 || 29 || 0.4 || 0.1 || 8.2 || 7.3 || 15.4 || 4.8 || 1.8
|- style="background-color: #EAEAEA"
! scope="row" style="text-align:center" | 2022
|style="text-align:center;"|
| 13 || 4 || 0 || 1 || 12 || 10 || 22 || 2 || 3 || 0.0 || 0.3 || 3.0 || 2.5 || 5.5 || 0.5 || 0.8
|- style="background:#EAEAEA; font-weight:bold; width:2em"
| scope="row" text-align:center class="sortbottom" colspan=3 | Career
| 21
| 6
| 2
| 145
| 129
| 274
| 78
| 34
| 0.3
| 0.1
| 6.9
| 6.1
| 13.0
| 3.7
| 1.6
|}

References

External links

2001 births
Living people
St Kilda Football Club players
Australian rules footballers from Victoria (Australia)
Sandringham Dragons players
Sandringham Football Club players